The Auburn Tigers women's basketball program is the intercollegiate women's basketball team that represents Auburn University. The school competes in the Southeastern Conference in Division I of the National Collegiate Athletic Association (NCAA). The Tigers play their homes games at Auburn Arena in Auburn, Alabama on the university campus. The program began in 1972.

Auburn has won five SEC regular season championships and four SEC tournament championships. Auburn has appeared in the NCAA tournament 21 times, making it as far as the championship game three times in a row in 1988, 1989, and 1990. Auburn has produced eight WNBA draft picks, including DeWanna Bonner who was selected with the fifth overall pick, the highest in Auburn history. Eight Auburn players have been named All-Americans and Auburn has had 73 All-SEC selections. Four Auburn players have been named SEC Player of the Year: Vickie Orr in 1988, Carolyn Jones in 1990 and 1991, Lauretta Freeman in 1993, and DeWanna Bonner in 2009. Former head coaches Joe Ciampi and Nell Fortner have been selected as National Coach of the Year a total of three times, and SEC Coach of the Year a total of five times.

History
The Auburn women's basketball team has been consistently competitive both nationally and within the SEC. Despite playing in the same conference as perennial powerhouse Tennessee and other competitive programs such as LSU, Georgia, Kentucky and Vanderbilt, and more recently, South Carolina, Mississippi State and Texas A&M, Auburn has won five regular season SEC championships and four SEC tournament championships.  Auburn has made 21 appearances in the NCAA women's basketball tournament, advancing to the Sweet 16 seven times and the Elite Eight six times. Auburn played in three consecutive National Championship games in 1988, 1989 and 1990, and won the Women's NIT in 2003.

When Coach Joe Ciampi announced his retirement after 25 years at the end of the 2003–2004 season, the resulting search snared the highly experienced, former Purdue and US National and Olympic team head coach, Nell Fortner. Fortner coached the team through the 2011–2012 season, including a 2009 SEC regular-season championship and a 30-4 record. The Tigers made two NCAA Tournament appearances in Fortner's eight-year tenure.

Fortner was replaced in 2012 by Terri Williams-Flournoy who had been the head coach at Georgetown University for eight seasons. Williams-Flournoy directed the Tigers to three NCAA Tournament appearances, a pair of 20-win seasons and two trips to the WNIT in her nine seasons.

Williams-Flournoy was relieved of her coaching duties following the 2020-21 season. On April 3, 2021, Johnnie Harris was named the program's seventh head coach.

Standout former Auburn players include: Mae Ola Bolton, Ruthie Bolton, Vickie Orr, Carolyn Jones, Chantel Tremitiere, Lauretta Freeman, Le'coe Willingham, DeWanna Bonner, Monique Morehouse, Blanche Alverson, Tyrese Tanner and Unique Thompson.

Players

Awards and honors

Retired jerseys

All-Americans

Other honors
SEC Player of the Year
Vickie Orr (1988)
Carolyn Jones (1990, 1991)
Lauretta Freeman (1993)
DeWanna Bonner (2009)
SEC Tournament MVP
Becky Jackson (1981)
Vickie Orr (1987)
Carolyn Jones (1990)
Laticia Morris (1997)
SEC Freshman of the Year
Mae Ola Bolton (1985)
Kristen Mulligan (1993)
SEC Scholar-Athlete of the Year
Blanche Alverson (2012, 2013)
Katie Frerking (2017)

Auburn in the WNBA

WNBA Draft picks
Auburn has produced eight WNBA draft picks, including three in the inaugural 1997 draft. DeWanna Bonner holds the record for the highest draft pick from Auburn, selected 5th overall in the 2009 draft.

Undrafted free agents
In addition to its eight WNBA draft picks, Auburn has had two undrafted free agents that went on to have WNBA careers.
Mandisa Stevenson (2004–2007)
Le'coe Willingham (2004–2013)

Awards and honors
Sixth Woman of the Year
DeWanna Bonner (2009, 2010, 2011)
All-Stars
Ruthie Bolton (1999, 2001)
DeWanna Bonner (2015, 2018, 2019, 2021)

Auburn in the Olympics

Championships and postseason

SEC regular season championships
Auburn has won five regular season Southeastern Conference championships in its history.

SEC Tournament
Auburn has won the SEC tournament four times, all under Joe Ciampi. Auburn defeated rival Alabama in the 1981 tournament 85–71 to win their first ever SEC Tournament title in the second edition of the tournament. Six years later in 1987, Auburn routed Georgia by a score of 83–57 to win their second championship. After losing in the championship game to Tennessee twice in a row in the following years, Auburn defeated Tennessee in the 1990 championship game 78–77. Auburn won its most recent SEC Tournament championship in 1997, defeating Florida 52–47. Auburn has reached the SEC Tournament final four other times, falling to Tennessee in 1985, 1988, and 1989 and falling to Vanderbilt in 2009.

Four Auburn players have been selected as SEC Tournament MVP: Becky Jackson in 1981, Vickie Orr in 1987, Carolyn Jones in 1990, and Laticia Morris in 1997. Auburn has had 22 players selected to the SEC All-Tournament teams, including most recently DeWanna Bonner and Whitney Boddie in 2009.

Season-by-season record

NCAA tournament results

References

External links